Heriades carinata is a species of bee in the family Megachilidae.

References

Further reading

 

Megachilidae
Articles created by Qbugbot
Insects described in 1864